Francisco-Javier Lozano Sebastián (born November 28, 1943) is a Spanish prelate of the Catholic Church who has spent his career in the diplomatic service of the Holy See. He has been an archbishop since 1994 and held the title of Apostolic Nuncio to several countries until his resignation in 2015.

Biography
He was born to a farming family in Villaverde de Íscar on November 28, 1943. He studied at the seminary in Seville and at the Pontifical University of Salamanca. He earned his licentiate in theology in 1966 from the Pontifical Gregorian University. He was ordained a priest on March 19, 1968, by Cardinal Antonio Samorè

In 1977 he obtained a doctorate in canon law from Lateran University, while already working in the Nunciature in Nigeria. His other early postings in the diplomatic service of the Holy See included South Africa, Zimbabwe, Yugoslavia, and Guatemala.

On July 25, 1994, Pope John Paul II appointed him titular archbishop of Penafiel and Apostolic Nuncio to Tanzania. He received his episcopal consecration from Cardinal Angelo Sodano on July 25. John Paul made him Nuncio to the Democratic Republic of the Congo on March 20, 1999, during the Second Congo War, where in 2000 he criticized the shelling of Kisangani as a "tragic and unjustified" targeting of the Christian population.

He returned to Rome in 2001 and worked in the Section for General Affairs of the Secretariat of State and in December was also made a member of the administrative council of Vatican Television.

John Paul made him Nuncio to Croatia on August 4, 2003, and he received his next posting from Pope Benedict XVI as Nuncio to both Romania and Moldova on December 10, 2007.

Pope Francis accepted his resignation as Nuncio on July 20, 2015.

Prize and awards
 October 24, 2020: the 9th edition of the John Paul II Prize in Bisceglie, Italy, together with Simona amabene, the Italian founder of the Marian family prayer Costola Rosa, the singers Golec uOrkiestra, Paolo Mengoli, Manuela Villa, Igor Minerva, Daniele Si Nasce, Devis Manoni, Silva Perentin, and the actors Daniela Poggi, Valentina Persia, Luca Capuano and Vincenzo Bocciarelli.

See also 

 Apostolic Nunciature
Apostolic Nuncio
Diplomacy of the Holy See
List of heads of the diplomatic missions of the Holy See

References

External links
 Catholic Hierarchy: Archbishop Francisco-Javier Lozano Sebastián 

1943 births
Living people
Apostolic Nuncios to Tanzania
Apostolic Nuncios to the Democratic Republic of the Congo
Apostolic Nuncios to Croatia
Apostolic Nuncios to Romania
Apostolic Nuncios to Moldova
People from the Province of Segovia